The following lists events that will happen or have happened during 2017 in Guatemala

Incumbents 
President: Jimmy Morales
Vice-President: Jafeth Cabrera

 
2010s in Guatemala
Guatemala
Guatemala
Years of the 21st century in Guatemala